A Time on Earth is a 1963 novel by Swedish writer Vilhelm Moberg. It's set in Laguna Beach, California, United States in 1962, where a Swedish-American lives.

It was translated into English in 1965 by Naomi Walford as "A Time on Earth".

References

1963 Swedish novels
Swedish-language novels
Novels by Vilhelm Moberg
Novels set in California
Novels set in the 1960s
Fiction set in 1962
Works about Swedish-American culture